Kabil Mahmoud was an Egyptian gymnast. He competed in the men's artistic individual all-around event at the 1920 Summer Olympics.

References

Year of birth missing
Year of death missing
Egyptian male artistic gymnasts
Olympic gymnasts of Egypt
Gymnasts at the 1920 Summer Olympics
Place of birth missing